Harry Stevenson Southam, CMG (May 18, 1875 – March 27, 1954) was a Canadian newspaper publisher of The Ottawa Citizen and chancellor of Carleton College from 1952 to 1954.

He was chairman and member of the board of trustees of the National Gallery of Canada from 1929 to 1953.

He was appointed a Companion of the Order of St Michael and St George in 1935.

Southam Hall on the campus of Carleton University is named after him.

References
 
 
 

1875 births
1954 deaths
Businesspeople from London, Ontario
Canadian newspaper publishers (people)
Chancellors of Carleton University
Canadian Companions of the Order of St Michael and St George